Bucculatrix muraseae is a moth in the family Bucculatricidae. It was described by Shigeki Kobayashi, Toshiya Hirowatari and Hiroshi Kuroko in 2010. It is found in Japan (Hokkaido, Honshu).

The wingspan is 6–8 mm. The forewings are white, with light brown streaks. The hindwings are grey.

The larvae feed on Alnus japonica. They mine the leaves of their host plant. The young larvae form a blackish linear mine. Pupation takes place in a bright yellow cocoon.

Etymology
The species is named for Mr. Murase, who collected specimens of this species.

References

Natural History Museum Lepidoptera generic names catalog

Bucculatricidae
Moths described in 2010
Moths of Japan